Anjalie Gupta is an Indian actress who primarily works in Hindi and Telugu films. She has worked in Satya 2.

Filmography

References

External links

Actresses in Hindi cinema
Indian film actresses
Living people
Year of birth missing (living people)
Actresses from Mumbai